A geyser is a periodic steam hot spring.

Geyser may also refer to:

People
 Albert Geyser (1918–1985), South African theologian
 Albert C. Geyser, American physician
 Jacqui Geyser (born 1974), South African field hockey player
 Riad Michael, German electronic musician

Vessels
 Geyser (fireboat, 1886), one of Chicago's first fireboats
 Geyser (fireboat, 1889), a fireboat built for Bay City, Michigan
 HMS Geyser (1841), a wooden paddle sloop of the Royal Navy, in service 1841–1866

Other uses
 Geyser (Mars), a type of gas and dust eruption in the south polar region of Mars
 The Geysers, a northern California geothermal plant
 Geyser FC, a football club based in N'Djamena, Chad
 Geyser, Montana, United States
 Geyser, a type of water heating system
 "Geyser", a song by Mitski from Be the Cowboy (2018)
 A term used for a domestic storage water heater, particularly in South Africa and India

See also
 Geysir, a hot spring in Iceland
 , a U.S.-flagged cargo ship
 List of geysers